Erode College of Pharmacy is a private pharmacy collector office located in Veppampalayam, Erode, Tamil Nadu, India.  It was established in 1992 and is affiliated to Tamil Nadu Dr. M.G.R. Medical University.  The college offers bachelor's and master's degrees in pharmacy.

References

External links

Pharmacy schools in India
Universities and colleges in Erode district
Education in Erode
Educational institutions established in 1992
1992 establishments in Tamil Nadu